National women's day in India is celebrated on 13 February every year, on the birthday of Sarojini Naidu she was born on 13 February 1879 in Hyderabad, India. Naidu was an active Indian independence movement leader and known for her literary works, particularly for her poems with the themes like patriotism, romanticism and lyric for which she is called "Nightingale of India"—(Bharat Kokila) by Mahatma Gandhi, Naidu had always stood for the empowerment of women in India.

References 

Sarojini Naidu
February observances
Women's rights in India